This list of law journals includes notable academic periodicals on law. The law reviews are grouped by jurisdiction or country and then into subject areas.

International

Public international law

Africa
 African Human Rights Law Journal
 African Journal of Legal Studies
 Comparative and International Law Journal of Southern Africa
 South African Law Journal

Australia
 Adelaide Law Review
 Alternative Law Journal
 Australian Guide to Legal Citation
 Australian Indigenous Law Review
 Australian Journal of Labour Law
 Australian Law Journal
 Company and Securities Law Journal
 Deakin Law Review
 Griffith Law Review
 Indigenous Law Bulletin
 James Cook University Law Review
 Macquarie Law Journal
 Melbourne University Law Review
 Monash University Law Review
 Sydney Law Review
 University of Queensland Law Journal
 University of Western Sydney Law Review

Canada
 Canadian Journal of Family Law
 University of Toronto Faculty of Law Review
 McGill Law Journal

Chile
Revista de Derecho

Europe
 European Competition Law Review
 European Intellectual Property Review
 European Journal of International Law
 Oil, Gas and Energy Law
 Utrecht Journal of International and European Law

Germany
 German Law Journal

India
 Annual Survey of Indian Law
 Banaras Law Journal
 Indian Journal of Law and Technology
 National Law School of India Review
 Symbiosis Contemporary Law Journal

United Kingdom

General
Cambrian Law Review
Cambridge Law Journal
Edinburgh Law Review
King's Law Journal
Law Quarterly Review
Modern Law Review
New Law Journal
Oxford Journal of Legal Studies

Public law
Public Law

Commercial law
Corporate Rescue and Insolvency

Labour law
Industrial Law Journal
Regulation & Governance

United States

 Annual Review of Law and Social Science

Canon law
Ecclesiastical Law Journal
The Jurist

See also
List of international law journals
List of intellectual property law journals
List of social science journals

External links
Law Reviews with Online Content from Mabie Law Library

 
Law